Takeo Kurusu (栗栖赳夫; 1895–1966) was a politician in Japan's Democratic Party. He served in various political and government offices, including the minister of finance in the cabinet led by Prime Minister Tetsu Katayama.

Biography
Kurusu was part of the Democratic Party and served as a member of the upper house. He was the minister of finance in the cabinet led by Prime Minister Tetsu Katayama. He also served as a minister without portfolio in the cabinet of Prime Minister Hitoshi Ashida and acted as the director of the economic planning board. While serving in the office he was arrested on 30 September 1948 together with many other senior Japanese politicians due to their alleged involvement in a bribery scandal in relation to the Showa Electric Company. The trials lasted until 1962, and Kurusu was one of three people who was found guilty and was sentenced to eight months in prison.

References

External links

20th-century Japanese politicians
1895 births
1966 deaths
Ministers of Finance of Japan
Members of the House of Peers (Japan)
Japanese politicians convicted of corruption
Democratic Party (Japan, 1947) politicians